Torkel Opsahl (17 March 1931 in Stavanger — 16 September 1993 in Geneva) was a Norwegian human rights scholar, professor of the University of Oslo since 1965 and head of the board of its Human Rights Institute since 1987. From 1970 to 1984, he was a member of the European Commission of Human Rights. Between 1977 and 1986, he was a member of the UN Human Rights Committee. In 1992-1993 he chaired an independent commission exploring ways forward for Northern Ireland, out of which came the influential book 'A Citizens' Inquiry: the Opsahl Report on Northern Ireland'. Opsahl died from a heart attack at his office in Geneva on 16 September 1993. At the time of his death, he was chairing the UN commission on war crimes in the former Yugoslavia.

External links
Biography University of Oslo
Obituary The New York Times
Genealogy
Bibliography

See also
 Njål Høstmælingen
 Tove Stang Dahl

1931 births
1993 deaths
Academic staff of the University of Oslo
Norwegian legal scholars
United Nations Human Rights Committee members
Members of the European Commission of Human Rights
Norwegian officials of the United Nations